Marte Brekke Michelet (born 26 May 1975) is a Norwegian journalist, critic and non-fiction writer.

She is the daughter of novelist and politician Jon Michelet and Toril Brekke. They resided in Lindeberg, Oslo before her parents split up. Marte Michelet moved into an apartment in Oslo, that once had housed a young Jewish girl who was deported to Auschwitz.

She started her career in RadiOrakel and as a journalist in NRK. In 2006 she was hired in Dagbladet, where she rose to political commentator. She was also at one point the restaurant critic Robinson & Fredag. She resigned in 2014 when moving with her former husband Ali Esbati to Sweden; he was elected as a member of Parliament there.

In 2014 she released the book Den største forbrytelsen about the Holocaust in Norway, receiving rave reviews and promptly winning the Brage Prize.

Bibliography 
 Kvinnekamp i sari : Møte med kvinner i India og Nepal (1997) (co-authored with Kjersti Ericsson og Sissel Henriksen). Arbeidernes kommunistparti
 Den største forbrytelsen (2014) 
 Hva visste hjemmefronten? (2018), Gyldendal

References

1975 births
Living people
Writers from Oslo
Red Party (Norway) politicians
Norwegian journalists
Norwegian women journalists
Dagbladet people
Norwegian non-fiction writers
Norwegian women non-fiction writers
Norwegian critics
Norwegian women critics
Norwegian expatriates in Sweden
Restaurant critics